Anna Maria Piaggi (22 March 1931 – 7 August 2012) was an Italian fashion writer. She was known for her bright blue hair, liberal use of make-up, and her sense of style that mixed vintage and contemporary fashion.

Career 
Piaggi was born in Milan on 22 March 1931. She worked as a translator for an Italian publishing company Mondadori, then wrote for fashion magazines such as the Italian edition of Vogue and, in the 1980s, the avant-garde magazine Vanity. From 1988 she designed double page spreads in the Italian Vogue, where her artistic flair was given free expression in a montage of images and text, with layout by Luca Stoppini. These networks of images and ideas built upon Piaggi's awareness of fashion and art history to provide an open-ended attempt at understanding fashion designers' influences.

She used a bright red Olivetti "Valentina" manual typewriter designed by Ettore Sottsass in 1969. She dressed in an exuberant, unique and eclectic way.

Piaggi appeared in the documentary Bill Cunningham New York about The New York Times fashion and social photographer Bill Cunningham.

Personal life
Piaggi married the photographer Alfa Castaldi in 1962 in New York. Castaldi died in 1995. Piaggi died in Milan on 7 August 2012.

Books
 (with Karl Lagerfeld) Karl Lagerfeld: A Fashion Journal. Thames and Hudson, 1986. 
 (with Gianni Brera) Africa di Missoni per Italia 90. Edizioni Electa, 1990. 
 Anna Piaggi's Fashion Algebra. Thames and Hudson, 1998. 
 Doppie pagine di Anna Piaggi in Vogue. Leonardo Arte, 1998. 
 (with Anna Wintour, Michael Roberts, André Leon Talley and Manolo Blahnik) Manolo Blahnik Drawings. Thames and Hudson, 2003.

References

Further reading 

 Clark, Judith (editor). Anna Piaggi Fashion-ology. Victoria and Albert Museum, 2006. /.
 Lagerfeld, Karl. Lagerfeld's Sketchbook: Karl Lagerfeld's Illustrated Fashion Journal of Anna Piaggi. Weidenfeld & Nicolson, 1988. .

2012 deaths
1931 births
Italian women writers
Fashion journalists
Italian socialites
Journalists from Milan
Italian women journalists